Don't Play with Matches is the debut album of the American Alternative rock band Tabitha's Secret. The tracks were recorded in 1993–1995, although the album was released in 1997. It is thought that it was released to capitalise on the popularity of Rob Thomas's next band Matchbox 20's album Yourself Or Someone Like You. The songs "3 A.M." and "Tired" were both rerecorded by Matchbox 20.

Track listing
All tracks are co-written by Thomas, Stanley, Goff and Yale

"3 A.M." (Rob Thomas, John Goff, Jay Stanley, Brian Yale) - 3:43
"Forever December" - 5:58
"Here Comes Horses" - 4:26
"Paint Me Blue" - 4:58
"Dear Joan" - 4:51
"High" - 4:40
"Unkind" - 3:29
"Jesus Was An Alien" - 4:37
"Tired" - 3:58
"Swing" - 3:53
"3 A.M." (Rob Thomas, John Goff, Jay Stanley, Brian Yale) - 3:47
"Forever December" - 4:32
"Dizzy (hidden track)" - 5:08

Credits
Rob Thomas - Lead Vocals, PianoJohn Goff - Background Vocals, GuitarJay Stanley - Background Vocals, GuitarBrian Yale - Bass GuitarPaul Doucette - Drums/PercussionEngineered and Mixed by Dana Cornock, Dave Bell and Jay StanleyMastered by Dana CornockConcept by Jay StanleyPhotography by Dominic Casale

1997 albums
Tabitha's Secret albums